Ferante Colnago (11 July 1907 in Split – 15 May 1969 in Belgrade) was a Croatian football player. He has one cap for the Yugoslav national team.

He was sometimes referred to as Ferante Kolnago which is the Serbian spelling.

Playing career
Playing mostly as a central defender he started to play in the youth teams of HNK Hajduk Split but failed to debut in the first team. Afterwards, he moved to Zagreb where he signed with HŠK Concordia. It was while he was playing with SK Soko from Belgrade that he played his only match for the Yugoslav national team. It was on 19 May 1929 in Paris that Yugoslavia had achieved its first win over the "tricolor" by 3-1 and Ferante's brilliant performance on the match did not pass unnoticed, having earned him a call to join, together with Ivica Bek, Olympique de Marseille, where he would play two seasons. Between 1931 and 1938 he played with Rapid București in Romania.

After a heavy injury, he retired and returned to Belgrade where he began working as a bank employee.

References

External sources
 
 Profile at Reprezentacija.rs.

1907 births
1969 deaths
Footballers from Split, Croatia
Association football defenders
Yugoslav footballers
Yugoslavia international footballers
HŠK Concordia players
FK BASK players
Olympique de Marseille players
FC Rapid București players
Yugoslav expatriate footballers
Expatriate footballers in France
Yugoslav expatriate sportspeople in France
Expatriate footballers in Romania
Yugoslav expatriate sportspeople in Romania